The House at 193 Vernon Street in Wakefield, Massachusetts is a late Federal-style house, built. c. 1840.  The -story wood-frame house is a rare local example of a three-wide four-deep construction.  It has a main entrance on the front facade that has sidelights and a pedimented entablature that were probably added later, and also has a side entrance with a Federal-style transom and sidelights.  A late 19th-century barn stands behind the house, a reminder of the area's agricultural use.

The house was listed on the National Register of Historic Places in 1989.

See also
National Register of Historic Places listings in Wakefield, Massachusetts
National Register of Historic Places listings in Middlesex County, Massachusetts

References

Houses on the National Register of Historic Places in Wakefield, Massachusetts
Federal architecture in Massachusetts
Houses completed in 1840
Houses in Wakefield, Massachusetts
1840 establishments in Massachusetts